The Angeles Brewing and Malting Company was a brewery that operated in Port Angeles, Washington. The company is notable for having owned a steamboat, the Albion, that was sunk in a collision on Puget Sound.

Business 
The company began doing business in 1901. It purchased the small steamship Albion to haul full kegs of beer to various cities on Puget Sound. In 1910, the company suffered two major reverses. First it was placed in receivership in April and then in May Albion was struck in a collision at sea and sank. The company stayed in business, however, until 1915, when statewide Prohibition took effect in Washington.

See also
 List of defunct breweries in the United States

Notes

References
 Newell, Gordon, R., ed. H.W. McCurdy Maritime History of the Pacific Northwest, Superior Publishing 1966.
 History of the Angeles Brewing and Malting Company (accessed 05-15-11)

External links

Defunct shipping companies based in Washington (state)
Defunct brewery companies of the United States
History of Clallam County, Washington
Defunct manufacturing companies based in Washington (state)